Turricephaly is a type of cephalic disorder where the head appears tall with a small length and width. It is due to premature closure of the coronal suture plus any other suture, like the lambdoid, or it may be used to describe the premature fusion of all sutures. It should be differentiated from Crouzon syndrome. Oxycephaly (or acrocephaly) is a form of turricephaly where the head is cone-shaped, and is the most severe of the craniosynostoses.

Presentation

Common associations
It may be associated with:
 8th cranial nerve lesion
 Optic nerve compression
 Intellectual disability
 Syndactyly

Conditions with turricephaly
 Acrocephalosyndactyly
 Acrocephalosyndactyly type V (Goodman syndrome)
 Acrocraniofacial dysostosis
 Craniorhiny
 Craniosynostosis and dental anomalies
 MEGF8-related Carpenter syndrome
 Saethre-Chotzen syndrome
 Summitt syndrome
 Tolchin-Le Caignec syndrome
 TWIST1-related craniosynostosis

Diagnosis

Treatment

See also
 Acrocephalosyndactylia

References

Further reading
 NINDS Overview

External links 

Congenital disorders of musculoskeletal system
Rare diseases